Ricardo Cavalcante Ribeiro (born 23 February 1977) is a Brazilian football player.

Club statistics

References

External links

biglobe.ne.jp

1977 births
Living people
Brazilian footballers
Brazilian expatriate footballers
Expatriate footballers in Japan
J1 League players
J2 League players
Kashima Antlers players
Vegalta Sendai players
Sanfrecce Hiroshima players
Kyoto Sanga FC players
Joinville Esporte Clube players
Esporte Clube Juventude players
Association football defenders